Mohammad Emad Mostaque  is the founder and CEO of Stability AI, one of the companies behind Stable Diffusion.

Early life 

Mostaque was born in Jordan, but was taken to Dhaka, Bangladesh a month later, and to the United Kingdom at age seven.

At age 19 he met his wife while on a student trip to the United States. He has been diagnosed with Asperger's and ADHD. In his twenties, he became interested in helping the Islamic world by creating online forums for Muslim communities and developing "Islamic AI" which would help guide people on their religious journey.

Career 

Mostaque received his master's degree in mathematics and computer science from Oxford University in 2005. He then went on to spend 13 years working at various hedge funds in the United Kingdom.

In 2019 he founded Symmitree, a startup that aimed to reduce the cost of technology for individuals living in poverty, which he worked on for 1 year.

In late 2020 he founded Stability AI. Much of the company's funding comes directly from Mostaque, who is a former hedge fund manager, as well as other investment companies such as Eros Investments. The company spent $600,000 of its $10 million initial funding to train Stable Diffusion, and announced a $100 million seed round of a valuation of $1 billion.

References 

Living people
Year of birth missing (living people)
Bangladeshi emigrants to England
Alumni of the University of Oxford
British hedge fund managers
English company founders